Leonid Solovyov or Soloviev may refer to the following Russian people:
Leonid Solovyov (footballer) (1917–2004)
 Leonid Solovyov (writer) (1906–1962)